Milestones: Greatest Hits is a compilation album by American country music singer-songwriter Holly Dunn. It was released by Warner Bros. Nashville in July 1991.

Milestones contains eleven songs, all but one of which are previously released. Five of them, including Dunn’s self-penned well-beloved hit "Daddy's Hands", were originally released in the late 1980’s by independent label MTM Records. Four more, including her two #1 country hits "Are You Ever Gonna Love Me" and "You Really Had Me Going", were originally put out by Warner Bros. Nashville, which signed Dunn after MTM closed its doors in late 1988 and acquired her MTM masters. In addition, "A Face in the Crowd" — a duet with Michael Martin Murphey that appeared in the latter’s thirteenth studio album Americana (1987), also released by Warner Bros. — and the controversial "Maybe I Mean Yes", a brand-new song, also make their appearances in Milestones.

Two singles were released from the album: "Maybe I Mean Yes" and "No One Takes the Train Anymore", which was previously an album track from Dunn’s fourth studio album The Blue Rose of Texas (1989). The former peaked at #48 on the Billboard Hot Country Singles & Tracks chart.

Milestones peaked at #25 on the Top Country Albums chart and #162 on the Billboard 200 and was certified Gold by the Recording Industry Association of America.

Track listing

Personnel

 Eddie Bayers – drums
 Pete Bordonali – acoustic guitar, electric guitar
 Mike Brignardello – bass guitar
 Dennis Burnside – keyboards
 Larry Byrom – acoustic guitar
 Mark Casstevens – acoustic guitar
 Beth Nielsen Chapman – background vocals
 Joe Diffie – background vocals
 Holly Dunn – lead vocals, background vocals
 Paul Franklin – steel guitar
 Sonny Garrish – steel guitar
 Steve Gibson – banjo, dobro, acoustic guitar, electric guitar
 Jon Goin – electric guitar
 Rob Hajacos – fiddle
 David Hoffner – keyboards
 Bill Hullet – acoustic guitar, electric guitar
 Roy Huskey Jr. – upright bass
 Tony King – background vocals
 Chris Leuzinger – acoustic guitar, electric guitar
 Bill Lloyd – acoustic guitar
 Larrie Londin – drums
 Terry McMillan – harmonica
 Brent Mason – electric guitar
 Michael Martin Murphey – duet vocals on "A Face in the Crowd"
 Mark O'Connor – fiddle
 Don Potter – acoustic guitar
 Tom Robb – bass guitar
 Brent Rowan – electric guitar
 Steve Schaffer – bass guitar
 Gary Smith – keyboards
 James Stroud – drums
 Chris Waters – acoustic guitar, background vocals
 Biff Watson – acoustic guitar, keyboards
 Tommy Wells – drums
 Dennis Wilson – background vocals
 Lonnie Wilson – drums, background vocals
 Glenn Worf – bass guitar
 Curtis Young – background vocals

Chart performance

References

1991 greatest hits albums
Holly Dunn albums
Warner Records compilation albums